"Feel Fine!" is song by Japanese singer songwriter Mai Kuraki, taken from her third studio album Fairy Tale (2002). It was released on April 24, 2002 by Giza Studio, simultaneously with her first remix album Cool City Production Vol. 3 "Mai-K's Club Side". The song was written by Kuraki herself and Akihito Tokunaga and served as the commercial song to Shiseido's brand "Sea Breeze". The remixes of the song Cool City Production Vol. 4 "Mai-K" Feel Fine! was released later.

Commercial performance
"Feel Fine!" debuted at number two on the Oricon weekly singles chart. It has sold over 451,500 copies as of 2018 and been certificated double platinum by Recording Industry Association of Japan (RIAJ). It has been her sixth best-selling song and considered as one of her representative songs.

Track listing

Charts

Weekly charts

Year-end charts

Certification and sales

Release history

La PomPon version

Japanese idol girl group La PomPon released a cover version of the song on August 30, 2017 as their sixth single from their first compilation album Best of La PomPon. The song was released as a double-A side with their original song, "Mr. Lonely Boy".

Music video
A short version of the official music video was released on the group's official YouTube account on July 25, 2017. As of March 2018, it has received over 40,000 views on YouTube.

Track listing

Charts

Weekly charts

Release history

References

External links
Mai Kuraki Official Website

Mai Kuraki songs
2002 singles
2002 songs
Songs written by Mai Kuraki
Giza Studio singles
Songs with music by Akihito Tokunaga
Song recordings produced by Daiko Nagato